Garth View may refer to:

A hillside of the Garth Hill in South Wales composed of the communities of Llantwit Fardre and Pentyrch
A locality in Bedwas, Caerphilly in South Wales
A historic cottage in Bolton